Steven Michael Santini (born March 7, 1995) is an American professional ice hockey defenseman who is currently playing for the Springfield Thunderbirds in the American Hockey League (AHL) while under contract to the St. Louis Blues of the National Hockey League (NHL). He has also played for the New Jersey Devils and the Nashville Predators. He played for the Boston College Eagles men's ice hockey team of the NCAA Hockey East conference. Santini was selected by the New Jersey Devils in the 2nd round (42nd overall) of the 2013 NHL Entry Draft.

Playing career

Amateur
Santini spent his first two years of high school at John F. Kennedy Catholic High School in Somers, New York before moving to Ann Arbor, Michigan to participate in the USA Hockey National Team Development Program.

As a youth, Santini played in the 2008 Quebec International Pee-Wee Hockey Tournament with the New York Rangers minor ice hockey team.

Santini was rated as a top prospect who had been projected as a first round selection of the 2013 NHL Entry Draft. He trained with the USA Hockey National Team Development Program team from 2011 to 2013, and won a Silver Medal with Team USA at the 2013 IIHF World U18 Championships where he was named the tournament's best defenseman.

In his first season at Boston College, Santini earned his role as a top-4 defensemen with the Eagles, garnering a reputation as a hard-hitting, shut-down defenseman, while also producing 3 goals and 11 points on the season. He was named to Hockey East's All-Rookie team. He also played at the 2014 World Juniors for the United States.

Santini started his sophomore campaign paired with freshman Noah Hanifin as the top-2 defenseman for the Eagles, however, he only played in four games to start the season before being shut down due to a wrist injury. He underwent surgery, missed 16 games and returned to the lineup after the New Year's break.

He scored one goal and assisted on 19 as a junior, while helping the BC Eagles to a Frozen Four appearance where they fell short to Quinnipiac.

Professional
He signed a three-year entry level deal with the New Jersey Devils of the National Hockey League on April 9, 2016. He played his first NHL game later that night against the Toronto Maple Leafs.

Santini scored his first NHL point in his 2016–17 NHL debut, during a 3-0 win over the Boston Bruins on January 2, 2017. He scored his first NHL goal on January 12, 2017, against the Edmonton Oilers, due to a puck deflecting off his elbow. The Devils ended up losing in overtime 3–2.

As a restricted free agent, Santini signed a three-year, $4.25 million contract with the Devils on August 14, 2018.

On June 22, 2019, Santini was traded by the Devils along with prospect Jeremy Davies and draft picks to the Nashville Predators in exchange for P. K. Subban. In the following 2019-20 season, Santini struggled to make an impression with the Predators, appearing in just 2 games over the course of the season while playing the majority of the campaign in the AHL with affiliate, the Milwaukee Admirals. 

On October 7, 2020, Santini was placed on unconditional waivers by the Predators for the purpose to buyout the remaining year of his contract. On October 10, Santini signed as a free agent to a one-year, two-way contract with the St. Louis Blues.

Personal life
Santini's grandfather, Bob, coached hockey at Mount Saint Michael Academy in the Bronx and founded the Catholic High School Hockey League which became part of New York's Catholic High School Athletic Association. Santini's father, Steve, played college hockey at Maine and his uncle, Rob, played at Iona. Steve and Rob later opened Brewster Ice Arena in Brewster, New York where Santini grew up playing hockey. Santini's three sisters also attended John F. Kennedy Catholic High School.

Santini is Catholic and his decision to attend Boston College was based in part on its being a Jesuit institution.

Career statistics

Regular season and playoffs

International

Awards and honours

References

External links 
 

1995 births
Living people
Albany Devils players
American men's ice hockey defensemen
Binghamton Devils players
Boston College alumni
Boston College Eagles men's ice hockey players
Catholics from New York (state)
Ice hockey players from New York (state)
Milwaukee Admirals players
Nashville Predators players
New Jersey Devils draft picks
New Jersey Devils players
People from Mahopac, New York
Sportspeople from the New York metropolitan area
St. Louis Blues players
Springfield Thunderbirds players
USA Hockey National Team Development Program players
Utica Comets players